Three Missing Links is a 1938 short subject directed by Jules White starring American slapstick comedy team The Three Stooges (Moe Howard, Larry Fine and Curly Howard). It is the 33rd entry in the series released by Columbia Pictures starring the comedians, who appearing in 190 shorts for the studio between 1934 and 1959.

Plot
The boys are janitors at Hollywood studio Super Terrific Productions. They are cleaning the office of B. O. Botswaddle (James C. Morton), who is reviewing a script for a new picture called, Jilted in the Jungle, where the leading man will be a gorilla. After unintentionally destroying Botswaddle's office, the trio are nearly fired. But, after Curly does his classic imitation of a "chicken with its head cut off" followed by other motions, Botswaddle declares Curly to be the "dead image of the missing link". Moe and Larry are also cast in the movie, and they are sent off to Africa to begin shooting.

While setting up camp, Curly buys some "love candy" from a cannibalistic medicine man (John Lester Johnson), in hopes of impressing leading lady Mirabel Mirabel (Jane Hamilton). That night, while the Stooges are sleeping, a lion (Tanner) licks their feet, frightening them as they run off with their tent. Problems arise when Curly (dressed as a gorilla) gets entangled with a real gorilla (Ray "Crash" Corrigan), who scares the film crew off the set. The gorilla then turns his attention to Curly, who, in trying to placate the beast, eats some of the love candy and falls in love with it. Repulsed, the gorilla dashes off with a lovestruck Curly in pursuit.

Cast

Credited

Production notes
Three Missing Links was filmed on April 7–12, 1938. It is the fourth of sixteen Stooge shorts to use the word "three" in the title and the first entry directed by Columbia Pictures Short Subject head Jules White.

The clip of the Stooges arguing in B. O. Botswaddle's office was featured prominently in the 1989 film Lethal Weapon 2.

Tanner the Lion appears before the final act of the film, having previously appeared in Wee Wee Monsieur from the same year, and Movie Maniacs from 2 years prior.

Quotes
Moe: "We're terrific!"
Larry: "We're colossal!"
Curly: "We're even mediocre!"

References

External links 
 
 
Three Missing Links at threestooges.net

1938 films
The Three Stooges films
American black-and-white films
1938 comedy films
Films directed by Jules White
Columbia Pictures short films
American slapstick comedy films
1930s English-language films
1930s American films